D'Urville Island, Māori name  ('red heavens look to the south'), is an island in the Marlborough Sounds along the northern coast of the South Island of New Zealand. It was named after the French explorer Jules Dumont d'Urville. The local authority is the Marlborough District Council.

History

The official name of the island is Rangitoto ki te Tonga / D'Urville Island, with the Māori language name, associated with Kupe, meaning "Red Heavens Look to the South". The island was a traditional source of argillite (pakohe), used in the production of stone tools such as adzes during the Archaic period (1300–1500). From the 1600s until the early 1800s, the island was a part of the rohe of Ngāti Tūmatakōkiri. In the present day, the island is within the rohe of Ngāti Koata and Ngāti Kuia.

Geography
The island has a convoluted coastline, as is frequently found with islands formed from peaks between sea-drowned valleys. The eastern coast of the island is relatively smooth, marked mainly by the small D'Urville Peninsula, some halfway along its length. In contrast, the west coast is marked by three large inlets: Port Hardy in the north, Greville Harbour in the centre, and Manuhakapakapa in the south. The island's highest point, Takapōtaka / Attempt Hill lies close to the centre of the island, due east of Greville Harbour. Most of the island's residents live close to the more sheltered east coast, with the localities of Patuki and Mukahanga being close to the northern tip of the island.

French Pass
Several vortices occur near this passage. d'Urville investigated the passage for several days in 1827, and damaged his ship passing through it.

Flora and Fauna 
There is roughly 6,000ha of public conservation land on D'urville Island, this is mainly through the centre of the island. The conservation land consists of regenerating farmland, coastal broadleaf, and beech forest.

D'Urville Island is free of possums, feral goats, ship rats, Norway rats and, weasels making it important ecologically Red Deer and feral pigs are present on the Island and a permit can be obtained from the New Zealand Department of Conservation to hunt on the public conservation land.

Stoats on the island have caused the local extinction of the little spotted kiwi, South Island kākā and yellow eyed kakariki. D'Urville Island Stoat Eradication Charitable Trust started in 2003 to attempt remove stoats from the island. A large scale stoat eradication programme was funded for the Island but after issues with land access the funding was withdrawn

There is a population of the rare South Island long-tailed bat on the island.

Transport

Air
A small Department of Conservation maintained airstrip is located at Moawhitu, Greville Harbour. Pelorus Air has flights to D'Urville Island from Picton, Wellington and Paraparaumu.

Boat
A barge service is operated by D'Urville Island Crossings between French Pass village and the settlement of Kapowai. There is also a water taxi operating between the D’Urville Island Wilderness Resort at Catherine Cove and French Pass.

In 2016, Motueka based Abel Tasman Sea Shuttles hosted a number of charity cruises around D'Urville Island in conjunction with the Rotary Club of Motueka.

Tours
Driftwood Eco Tours  take small group tours to D'Urville Island. The tours focus on the heritage and ecology of the island, meeting with local residents to learn about the island's unique features. Driftwood Eco Tours donate each year to 'DISECT' (D'Urville Island Stoat Eradication Trust).

See also
 Islands of New Zealand
 List of places named after people

References

External links

 d'Urvilles Forgotten Island

Islands of the Marlborough Sounds
Populated places in the Marlborough Sounds